35 Arietis (abbreviated 35 Ari) is a binary star in the northern constellation of Aries. 35 Arietis is the Flamsteed designation. It is approximately  distant from the Earth, based upon an annual parallax shift of 9.51 mas. This star is visible to the naked eye with an apparent visual magnitude of 4.64.

This is a single-lined spectroscopic binary system, with the presence of a companion being demonstrated by shifts in the spectrum of the primary component. The pair orbit each other with a period of 490.0 days and an eccentricity of 0.14. The primary is a B-type main-sequence star with a stellar classification of B3 V. With a mass around 5.7 times that of the Sun, it is radiating 870 times the Sun's luminosity. This energy is being emitted from the outer atmosphere at an effective temperature of 17,520 K, causing it to shine with the blue-white hue of a B-type star.

References

External links
 Image 35 Arietis

Aries (constellation)
B-type main-sequence stars
Arietis, 35
Spectroscopic binaries
Durchmusterung objects
0801
012719
016908